The 2013 Italian Athletics Championships was the 103rd edition of the Italian Athletics Championships and were held in Milan on 26–28 July 2013.

Champions

See also
2013 Italian Athletics Indoor Championships

References

External links
 All results at FIDAL web site

2013 in athletics (track and field)
2013 in Italian sport
2013
Athletics competitions in Italy
Sports competitions in Milan